Oscar de Dios (born 21 August 1948) is an Argentine rower. He competed in the men's eight event at the 1972 Summer Olympics.

References

1948 births
Living people
Argentine male rowers
Olympic rowers of Argentina
Rowers at the 1972 Summer Olympics
Place of birth missing (living people)
Pan American Games medalists in rowing
Rowers at the 1971 Pan American Games
Pan American Games gold medalists for Argentina